Termonerpeton is a genus of Carboniferous tetrapods from Scotland that lived around 336 million years ago. The only species is Termonerpeton markrydactylus.

References

Prehistoric tetrapod genera